The 2014 Under 21 Men's Australian Hockey Championships was a men's field hockey tournament held in the New South Wales city of Sydney.

New South Wales won the gold medal after defeating Victoria 7–2 in the final. Western Australia won the bronze medal by defeating Queensland 3–0 in the third and fourth playoff.

Competition format
The tournament is played in a round robin format, with each team facing each other once. Final placings after the pool matches determine playoffs.

The bottom four teams play in the classification round. Two crossover matches are played, with the fifth placed team playing the eighth place team and the fifth placed team facing the sixth placed team. The winners of the crossover matches progress to the fifth and sixth place playoff, while the losers contest the seventh and eighth place playoff.

The top four teams contest the medal round. Two semi-finals are played, with the first placed team taking on the fourth placed team and the second placed team taking on the third placed team. The winners progress to the final, while the losers contest the third and fourth place playoff.

Teams
  ACT
  NSW
  NT
  QLD
  SA
  TAS
  VIC
  WA

Results

Pool matches

Classification matches

Fifth to eighth place classification

Crossover matches

Seventh and eighth place

Fifth and sixth place

First to fourth place classification

Semi-finals

Third and fourth place

Final

Statistics

Final standings

References

2014
2014 in Australian field hockey
Sports competitions in Sydney